Invincible is the first public album by the group Two Steps From Hell, released in May 2010. It consists of 22 tracks written by composers Thomas J. Bergersen and Nick Phoenix. The tracks are a collection of fan favourites from prior demonstration albums previously only available to the industry, "represent[ing] the very best of Thomas and Nick’s first few years at Two Steps From Hell". Two tracks, however, are brand new compositions ("Am I Not Human?" and "To Glory").

Having gained a cult following online following their 2006 creation, fans of the group began "relentlessly begging" for their private industry music to be made available commercially. Two Steps From Hell announced the album in late 2009; Bergersen later confirmed, "we are doing this purely to please our fans". It had the working title of Genesis. Upon release, it went to number 1 on the iTunes Classical charts and remained in the top 10 for over a year.

Initially a digital release, it was eventually released physically a year later via CD Baby, after the group reached 20,000 likes on their Facebook page.

Track listing
Tracks 1, 16, and 17 are reworked versions from their original releases.

Critical reception
James Monger of AllMusic reviewed the album favourably, rating it three and a half out of five stars.

The review at Trailer Music News was very positive, calling it a "musical triumph" and that it "meets the lofty expectations set forth by the community easily, often managing to surpass them... each track will tug at your heart in its own unique and powerful manner". However it did criticise its release in mp3 compression and the lack of lossless availability.

IFMCA-associated reviews website, MundoBSO, rated it seven out of ten stars.

The editorial team at the Remote Control Productions and Hans Zimmer-affiliated fansite, hans-zimmer.com, rated it four out of five stars.

Charts

Weekly charts

Year-end charts

Use in media

Many tracks from Invincible are frequently used in film trailers, television shows, and advertisements.

"Freedom Fighters" was used in:
the trailer for Evangelion: 1.0 You Are (Not) Alone
the trailer for the 2009 Star Trek movie

"Heart of Courage" was used in:

trailers for the movie The Chronicles of Narnia: The Voyage of the Dawn Treader
television spots for the DVD of the movie Avatar
trailers for the ABC television show Once Upon a Time in Wonderland
the movie Long Long Time Ago
the television show World War II in HD: The Air War
the television show Camelot
the television show Frozen Planet
the television show The Pacific
the television show Revolution
the mecha anime television series Buddy Complex, as the "Coupling Mode" theme
the reality shows Survivor Greece and Survivor Turkey
the official launch trailer of the video game Mass Effect 2
Season 1 of the television show Lucha Underground, as Mascarita Sagrada's entrance music
the History Channel docudrama The Innovators: The Men Who Built America
the History Channel documentary The Universe Season 6, in episode "Crash Landing on Mars"
the History Channel documentary Titanic at 100: Mystery Solved
the History Channel documentary History of the World in Two Hours
the History Channel docudrama The World Wars
Season 17 Episode 3, Season 18, and Season 22 of the BBC television show Top Gear
the opening theme for all games of UEFA Euro 2012
a Tod's television commercial
the release trailer of Nehrim: At Fate's Edge, a total conversion mod for the video game The Elder Scrolls IV: Oblivion
the floor music of gymnast Alicia Sacramone, along with Jorge Quintero's "300 Violin Orchestra", in 2011
A video showing 26 years of World Youth Days produced by Grassroots Media
a promotional video of the Ferrari FF
the main title theme of the Comedy Central television show Nathan For You
the ending credits of America's Got Talent (season 9) episode "Boot Camp", in 2014
a commercial for the mobile strategy game Game of War: Fire Age, in 2015
a commercial for the 1998 Disney film Mulan, in 2018
background music for various news telecasts by News Live
 an Italian documentary called Ulisse - Il piacere della scoperta
an episode of The Grand Tour presents... A Massive Hunt - episode 2

"Master of Shadows" was used in:
the trailer for the movie 2012
the trailer for the movie Abraham Lincoln: Vampire Hunter
commercials for the movie Harry Potter and the Deathly Hallows – Part 2
the History Channel docudrama The Innovators: The Men Who Built America
the television show Australia's Got Talent
the National Geographic Channel documentary Mission Pluto

"Moving Mountains" was used in:
the trailer for the movie 2012
the trailer for the movie A Good Day to Die Hard
the trailer for the movie Jumper
the trailer for the Twilight Saga movie New Moon
the International trailer for the movie X-Men: First Class
television spots for the movie The Debt
television spots for Harry Potter: Years 1-6 on Blu-ray
the HBO television series Game of Thrones
the BBC documentary Planet Dinosaur
a commercial for the video game Soul Calibur V

"Am I Not Human?" was used in:

promotional material for Tron: Legacy (Coca-Cola related campaign)
the trailer for the Mass Effect 3 Rebellion Multiplayer Downloadable Content
a Discovery Channel advertisement
the History Channel documentary Mankind: The Story of All of Us
the History Channel documentary The Universe Season 6, in the episodes "Crash Landing on Mars" and "God and the Universe"

"Fire Nation" was used in:
some History Channel documentaries, such as Titanic at 100: Mystery Solved and Your Bleeped Up Brain.

"Black Blade" was used in:

the trailer for the movie Priest
television spots for the movie Star Trek
television spots for the movie X-Men Origins: Wolverine
television spots for the movie X-Men: First Class
television spots for the movie Harry Potter and the Deathly Hallows – Part 2
television spots for the movie Abraham Lincoln: Vampire Hunter
television spots for the movie The Book of Eli
the trailer for the video game Mass Effect 3
the trailer for the video game Prince of Persia: The Sands of Time
the trailer "Future Visions" for the video game Kingdom of Amalur: Reckoning
commercials for the video game Homefront
commercials for the video game Star Wars: The Old Republic
commercials for the video game Binary Domain
trailers for the television show The Legend of Korra
trailers for the television show Atlantis
trailers for the television show Terra Nova
the History Channel documentary The Universe Season 6, in episode "Crash Landing on Mars"
the History Channel docudrama The World Wars

"Super Strength" was used in:
the trailer for WALL-E
the History Channel docudrama The Innovators: The Men Who Built America
a trailer for the video game Star Wars: The Old Republic

"Invincible" was used in:

a commercial for the HBO television show Game of Thrones
the long preview for the Adventure Time episode "Up a Tree"
a performance by the Massed Bands of the Royal Marines at the 2013 Mountbatten Festival of Music in London
the History Channel documentary, The Universe Season 6, in episode "Crash Landing on Mars"
the PlayStation 4 launch video on YouTube

"Fill My Heart" was used in:
the international trailer for The Young Victoria
a commercial for The Help
a television spot for the 3D re-release of Beauty and the Beast
the official trailer for Heaven Is for Real

"Protectors of the Earth" was used in:

 intro movie in Might and Magic Heroes VII
the trailer for the movie Inkheart
a featurette titled "Gringotts and Goblins" for Harry Potter and the Deathly Hallows – Part 2
an advert for the second half of the series 6 of Doctor Who
adverts for the television show Thundercats
the sixth episode of Season 3 of Blue Mountain State
the official trailer for the movie Gladiator
the opening titles for the History Channel documentary Vietnam in HD
the Jedi Consular class trailer in Star Wars: The Old Republic
the official launch trailer of the video game Mass Effect 3
a commercial for the television show MasterChef Asia, alongside "Rise of the Abyss" from the Solaris album
the presentation of the new Agia Sophia Stadium of A.E.K. Athens F.C.

"Velocitron" was used in:
commercials for the movie Harry Potter and the Deathly Hallows – Part 2
commerciales for the video game Assassin's Creed Brotherhood

"1000 Ships of the Underworld" was used in:
trailers for the movie Priest
trailers for the movie The Incredible Hulk
trailers for the movie Aliens vs. Predator: Requiem
trailers for the movie Miracle at St. Anna
trailers for the Twilight Saga movie Eclipse
promotional material for the movie Harry Potter and the Deathly Hallows – Part 2

"Tristan" was used in:

trailers for the movie Cloudy with a Chance of Meatballs
trailers for the movie Australia
a trailer for Series 6 of Doctor Who
the History Channel documentary, The Universe Season 6, in the episode "Crash Landing on Mars"

"Infinite Legends" was used in:

theatrical trailer for the Twilight Saga movie Breaking Dawn: Part 1
trailer for the television series Merlin
the first episode of the South Korean TV show The Genius

"Undying Love" was used in:

a promotional trailer for Halo Fest and in the History Channel documentary, The Universe Season 6, in episode "Crash Landing on Mars".

"After the Fall" was used in:

the "Take Earth Back" trailer for the video game Mass Effect 3a commercial for the television series Pretty Little Liarsthe History Channel documentary Titanic at 100: Mystery Solved"Enigmatic Soul" was used in:
a National Geographic Channel commercial.

"To Glory" was used in:

 Top Gear USA, season 9, episode 5, "Military Might"
 Top Gear USA, season 5, episode 4, "Snow Show"
an advert for the Adventure Time online video game
a commercial for the Marvel television series Avengers Assemblethe television show Death Battle'', in episode "Chuck Norris vs Segata Sanshiro"
Dubai 2015 New Years fireworks display
during Game 7 of the 2016 NBA Finals between the Cleveland Cavaliers and the Golden State Warriors

References

External links
Invincible, at Discogs

2010 compilation albums
Instrumental albums
Two Steps from Hell albums